Commander (Cdr) is a senior officer rank of the Royal Navy of the United Kingdom.  It is immediately junior to captain and immediately senior to the rank of lieutenant commander.  Officers holding the junior rank of lieutenant commander are not considered to be commanders.

History
The title (originally 'master and commander') originated in around 1670 to describe Royal Navy officers who commanded ships of war too large to be commanded by a lieutenant, but too small to warrant the assignment of a post-captain, or (before about 1770) a sailing-master who was in charge of a ship's navigation. These ships were usually unrated sloops-of-war of no more than 20 guns, fireships, hospital ships and store ships. The commanding officer of this type of ship was responsible for both sailing and fighting the ship and was thus its 'master and commander'.

Before 1750, the rank was broadly considered as the limit of advancement for those without patronage, especially those who had been promoted from among a ship's crew. By contrast, those with Parliamentary supporters or family connections were more likely to spend only a nominal period as master and commander of a sloop, before being elevated to post-captain. From 1718, the Navy List began recording an officer's date of appointment to the rank of master and commander, with the intention of establishing seniority as a guide to promotion, but there is little evidence that this carried through into actual appointments.

Over the later 18th century, the rank evolved into a more regular stage of service between lieutenant and captain. The Royal Navy shortened 'master and commander' to 'commander' in 1794; however, the term 'master and commander' remained (unofficially) in common parlance for several years. The term 'master commanding' (abbreviated as 'master com.' or 'mast. com.') was still recognised in 1851, with the Navy List for that year listing 21 ships commanded by Masters with this appellation .

The rank of commander was a popular recognition of service during the Napoleonic Wars, resulting in promotion of more commanders than there were commands; in 1812 the Navy List recorded 586 commanders against 168 available vessels. Commanders unable to secure a ship were left ashore on half-pay, with limited prospects for future advancement. This promotions bottleneck was addressed from 1827 with the introduction of commanders as a second-in-command on larger vessels.

In the 20th and 21st centuries, the rank has been assigned the NATO rank code of OF-4, matching the army rank of lieutenant colonel.

Seniority and usage
A commander in the Royal Navy is senior to an officer holding the rank of lieutenant commander but junior to a captain.  A commander may command a frigate, destroyer, submarine, mine countermeasures squadron, fishery protection squadron, patrol boat squadron, aviation squadron or shore installation, or may serve on a staff.  Formerly equivalent to the Army rank of major, a commander is now equivalent in rank to a lieutenant colonel in the British Army or a wing commander in the Royal Air Force. The rank of wing commander was derived from the naval rank of commander via the usage in the World War I Royal Naval Air Service.

The rank insignia of a commander features three rings of gold braid with a loop in the upper ring.

See also

 British and U.S. military ranks compared
 Comparative military ranks
 Royal Navy officer rank insignia

References

Military ranks of the Royal Navy
1670s introductions